Henry William Stiegel (May 13, 1729 in Cologne, Germany – January 10, 1785 in Pennsylvania, USA) was a German-American glassmaker and ironmaster.

Stiegel was the eldest of six children born to John Frederick and Dorothea Elizabeth Stiegel in the Free Imperial City of Cologne. He immigrated to British North America in 1750 with his mother and younger brother, Anthony (his father and other siblings had died). The Stiegels sailed on a ship known as the Nancy, and arrived in Philadelphia, Pennsylvania on August 31, 1750.

After arriving, Stiegel took a job in Philadelphia with Charles and Alexander Stedman, most likely as a clerk or bookkeeper. In 1752, Stiegel moved to what is now Lancaster County, Pennsylvania to work with Jacob Huber, an ironworker. He married Huber's daughter, eighteen-year-old Elizabeth, the same year. The couple had two daughters, Barbara (born 1756) and Elizabeth (born 1758). Elizabeth Huber Stiegel died on February 13, 1758, only ten days after giving birth to their second daughter. Stiegel married his second wife, Elizabeth Holtz, within a year. They had a son named Jacob.

When Jacob Huber died in 1758, Stiegel and several business partners from Philadelphia assumed ownership of Huber's foundry and renamed it Elizabeth Furnace (in honor of his wife). Stiegel later purchased a forge in Berks County called the Tulpehocken Eisenhammer. He called the place Charming Forge, another iron forge near Lancaster.

An active lay Lutheran and associate of Henry Melchior Muhlenberg, he donated the land on which the Lutheran church in Manheim, Pennsylvania is now built. Stiegel was also a founding member of the German Society of Pennsylvania, formed in 1764 to aid newly arrived German immigrants. He led the fundraising efforts to secure the plot of land on which the Society's first building was eventually erected. Stiegel reportedly died in poverty.

In 1934 the Lancaster County Historical Society erected a memorial to Stiegel in Manheim, Pennsylvania.

"Stiegel-type" glass

Stiegel advertised "enameled glass" for sale, and while he apparently did produce some actual enameled glass in his factory, it was long thought that this referred to the brightly colored style of "peasant glass" produced in Bohemia, Germany and Switzerland, some of which was imported to America. This type, whether made in Europe of America, is still often called "Stiegel-type" glass in America, even though it is now thought that Stiegel's advertisements actually meant white milk glass or the use of twisting white canes within stemware, not true enameled glass. Etched clear glasses may also be called "Stiegel-type".

References

Further reading 
George L. Heiges, Henry William Stiegel and His Associates: A Story of Early American Industry, 1948, 227 pages.
F. W. Hunter, "Baron Stiegel and American Glass," in The Metropolitan Museum of Art Bulletin, Vol. 8, No. 12 (Dec., 1913), pp. 258–261.

Further reading 

I Lift My Lamp by Anna Balmer Myers is a historical novel about the early settlement of Lancaster County that features Henry William Stiegel and his glassworks in Manheim, a Mennonite Eby family, and the Ephrata Cloister.
Baron Stiegel by M.H. Stine is a historical tale about Henry William Stiegel's life struggles and accomplishments.

External links 
Article on Stiegel from the Manheim Historical Society
Pennsylvania Colonial Iron Production at Elizabeth Furnace: An Archaeological and Historical Analysis

1729 births
1785 deaths
German emigrants to the Thirteen Colonies
American manufacturing businesspeople
American ironmasters
American people of German descent
Glass makers
People of colonial Pennsylvania